Qamishli  District is a district of al-Hasakah Governorate in northeastern Syria. The administrative centre is the city of Qamishli. At the 2004 census, the district had a population of 425,580.

Subdistricts
The district of Qamishli is divided into four subdistricts or nawāḥī (population as of 2004):

References

 
Districts of Al-Hasakah Governorate
Kurdish communities in Syria